This article describes the group stage of the 2012–13 EHF Cup.

Format

The 16 teams were split into four groups, consisting of four teams. Each team played a home and away game against all opponents in the group. The first and the second ranked teams advanced to the knockout stage.

The draw of the EHF Cup group phase was carried out on Thursday 6 December 2012 in Belgrade, Serbia. The teams were positioned into four pots, with the country protection rule applied: two clubs from the same country may not face each other in the same group. As is standard in EHF club competitions, the seeding is calculated on the basis of the three most recent seasons. Consequently, the results of the seasons 2011–12, 2010–11 and 2009–10 was considered to determine the seeding of the teams for the 2012–13 season. As there was the EHF Cup as well as the EHF Cup Winners' Cup parallel in these last three seasons, the results of both competitions of these seasons were added and then divided by two in order to get the points for the seeding for the 2012–13 season.

The group stage features 16 teams, which were allocated four groups of four. In each group, teams play against each other home-and-away in a round-robin format. The matchdays are 9–10 February, 16–17 February, 23–24 February, 9–10 March, 16–17 March, and 23–24 March 2013. The top two teams from each group qualify for the quarter-finals, which are scheduled in April 2013.

If Nantes, as the organiser of the Final 4 tournament, win their group or finish among top three second ranked teams, they will receive a direct qualification to the Final 4 tournament. In that case only four group winners and two best second ranked team will qualify for the quarter-finals. If Nantes finish as the worst second ranked team, they will have to play the quarter-final match. Should the French club rank on the third or fourth position in their group, they will be out of the competition, but they will still organize the Final 4 tournament.

If two or more teams are equal on points on completion of the group matches, the following criteria are applied to determine the rankings (in descending order):

number of points in matches of all teams directly involved;
goal difference in matches of all teams directly involved;
greater number of plus goals in matches of all teams directly involved;
goal difference in all matches of the group;
greater number of plus goals in all matches of the group;

If no ranking can be determined, a decision shall be obtained by drawing lots. Lots shall be drawn by the EHF, if possible in the presence of a responsible of each club.

Groups

Group A

Group B

Group C

Group D

Ranking of second-placed teams
The ranking of the second-placed teams was carried out on the basis of the team's results in the group stage, against the first and third placed teams. The results against teams which finished last in the group stage did not count in the ranking system.

References

External links 
 Official website

2012 in handball
2013 in handball